All Our Fears is a 2021 Polish biographical film directed by Łukasz Gutt and Łukasz Ronduda. It is based on the Catholic gay activist Daniel Rycharski.

Cast 
 Dawid Ogrodnik - Daniel Rycharski
 Maria Maj - Daniel's grandmother
 Andrzej Chyra - Daniel's father
 Oskar Rybaczek - Olek

Awards
 Best film at 2021 Gdynia Film Festival

References

External links 

2020s biographical films
Polish biographical films
Polish LGBT-related films
2021 LGBT-related films